Following is the list of all programmes broadcast by Imagine TV before the channel ceased all its operations.

Comedy series

Angrezi Mein Kehte Hain (2008–2009)
Ghar Ki Baat Hai (2009)
Jasuben Jayantilaal Joshi Ki Joint Family (2008–2009)
Raju Hazir Ho (2008–2009)

Drama series

Armanon Ka Balidaan-Aarakshan (2010–2011)
Baba Aiso Varr Dhoondo (2010–2012)
Basera (2009)
Beend Banoongaa Ghodi Chadhunga (2011–2012)
Chand Ke Paar Chalo (2008–2009)
Chandragupta Maurya (2011–2012)
Dehleez (2009)
Dharampatni (2011–2012)
Dharam Veer (2008)
Do Hanson Ka Jodaa (2010)
Dwarkadheesh - Bhagwaan Shree Krishn (2011–2012)
Ek Packet Umeed (2008)
Gunahon Ka Devta (2010–2011)
Haar Jeet (2011)
Jamuna Paar (2012)
Jyoti (2009–2010)
Jamunia (2010 - 2011)
Kitani Mohabbat Hai (2009)
Kitani Mohabbat Hai Season 2 (2010–2011)
Kashi – Ab Na Rahe Tera Kagaz Kora (2010)
Looteri Dulhan (2011)
Main Teri Parchhain Hoon (2008–2009)
Mahima Shani Dev Ki (2011)
Me Aajji Aur Sahib (2012)
Meera (2009–2010)
Neer Bhare Tere Naina Devi (2010)
Pardes Mein Mila Koi Apna (2011)
Raajkumar Aaryyan (2008)
Radhaa Ki Betiyaan Kuch Kar Dikhayengi (2008–2009)
Rakt Sambandh (2010–2011)
Ramayan (2008–2009)
Rehna Hai Teri Palkon Ki Chhaon Mein (2009–2010)
Sawaare Sabke Sapne Preeto (2011–2012)
Seeta Aur Geeta (2009)
Sarvggun Sampanna  (2010)
Vijay - Desh Ki Aankhen (2008)

Reality/non-scripted programming
Baba's Cross Connection (2011)
Big Money (2010)
Dil Jeetegi Desi Girl (2010)
Dhoom Macha De (2009)
Gajab Desh Ki Ajab Kahaniyaan (2011)
Gyan Guru (2012)
Indiadhanush (2008)
Knights and Angels (2009)
Meethi Choori No 1 (2010)
Nachle Ve with Saroj Khan (2008–2011)
Oye! It's Friday! (2008–2009)
Pati Patni Aur Woh (2008–2009)
Raaz Pichhle Janam Ka (2009–2011)
Rahul Dulhaniya Le Jayega (2010)
Rakhi Ka Swayamwar (2009)
Ratan Ka Rishta (2011)
Say Shaava Shaava (2008)
Shaadi 3 Crore Ki (2011)
The Tara Sharma Show (2012)
Zor Ka Jhatka: Total Wipeout (2011)

References

Imagine TV
I